The Macmillan Way West is a long-distance footpath in Somerset and Devon, England. It is one of the Macmillan Ways and connects with the main Macmillan Way at Castle Cary.

The path follows the valley of the River Cary to Somerton, then crosses the Somerset Levels to North Petherton.  From Langport to a point near Westonzoyland the route coincides with the River Parrett Trail.

From North Petherton the path climbs the Quantock Hills, and follows the ridge of the hills for several miles, passing their highest point, Will's Neck.  It descends through the village of Bicknoller, and then crosses low-level country to Williton and Dunster.  

After passing the village of Wootton Courtenay it then climbs to Exmoor at its highest point, Dunkery Beacon.  For the last  to Barnstaple,  the path follows the route of the Tarka Trail.

The path is waymarked from east to west, but not from west to east.

Route and points of interest

References 

Macmillan Way West The Macmillan Way Association

External links 
Macmillan Ways website

Exmoor
Long-distance footpaths in England
Footpaths in Somerset
Footpaths in Devon